Cyril George Northam (4 October 1894 – 21 January 1981) was an English professional footballer who played in the Football League for Wrexham as an outside right.

Personal life 
As of 1911, Northam was working as a merchant's clerk. Northam served as a private in the London Regiment during the First World War and was commissioned as a second lieutenant and attached to the Royal Scots in September 1916. His younger brother Arthur also served in the London Regiment and was killed in France on 23 May 1917. Northam served again in the Second World War, as lieutenant in the Royal Army Ordnance Corps. He remained in the army after the war and rose to the rank of honorary major, before moving back down to second lieutenant on 25 April 1952.

Career statistics

References 

Military personnel from Middlesex
English footballers
Brentford F.C. players
English Football League players
Southern Football League players
1894 births
People from Hendon
Association football outside forwards
Dulwich Hamlet F.C. players
Isthmian League players
Wrexham A.F.C. players
Connah's Quay & Shotton F.C. players
British Army personnel of World War II
British Army personnel of World War I
London Regiment soldiers
Royal Scots officers
Royal Army Ordnance Corps officers
1981 deaths